Rajat Sharma (born 18 February 1957) is an Indian journalist and businessperson who is the chairman and Editor-in-chief of India TV, an Indian news outlet. Sharma is known for his show Aap Ki Adalat in which he is seen interviewing politicians and celebrities in a courtroom-like setting.

Early life
Sharma was born 18 February 1957 in Sabzi Mandi, Delhi in a Brahmin family. He grew up with his 6 brothers and 1 sister. He did his schooling from Ramjas School. He did his higher studies from the Shri Ram College of Commerce (SRCC) and joined Akhil Bhartiya Vidyarthi Parishad. He was elected as General Secretary in Delhi University Students Union in 1977.

In 1997, he married Ritu Dhawan.

Career
After having completed his Master's degree (M Com), he was hired as a researcher by Janardan Thakur, a journalist who had just quit Ananda Bazar Patrika to start a new syndicate column. Subsequently, he joined the Onlooker Magazine as a trainee and then went on to become its editor in 1985. By this time, Rajat Sharma had shifted base to Mumbai. After having spent three years at Onlooker, he joined Sunday Observer as an editor and later on The Daily again as the editor. 
It was in 1992 that he bumped into Zee TV’s Subhash Chandra during a flight to Delhi and it was in the midst of a casual conversation that the concept of Aap Ki Adalat took shape. In 1993, the first episode of Aap Ki Adalat was shot for Zee TV with Lalu Yadav, the former-Chief Minister of Bihar. Rajat Sharma has interviewed more than 750 guests on his show and recently Aap Ki Adalat celebrated 21 years of broadcast thereby making it the longest running show in India’s television history. He also hosts the prime time show Aaj Ki Baat on India TV.

He was President of Delhi Cricket Association. He, however resigned only one month into his job citing corruption and various "pulls and pressures".

Awards

 Padma Bhushan (2015) by the Government of India for his contributions through Journalism.

References

1957 births
Living people
Indian television executives
Indian television news anchors
Indian television talk show hosts
People from New Delhi
Recipients of the Padma Bhushan in literature & education
20th-century Indian journalists
Indian male television journalists
Journalists from Delhi
Punjabi people